The Arizona Fall League (AFL) is an off-season sports league owned and operated by Major League Baseball (MLB) which operates during the autumn in Arizona, United States, at six different baseball complexes. Arizona Fall League rosters are filled by many of the top prospects in Minor League Baseball (MiLB) who are assigned by their parent clubs.

Structure

The six teams of the AFL are organized in two three-team divisions. Each AFL team is affiliated with five teams in Major League Baseball (MLB), and each MLB team provides seven players from their Minor League Baseball affiliates, yielding 35-man rosters. Specific players are invited (not assigned) to play in the AFL by their parent club. The league provides an environment for top prospects to advance their development, in a setting that MLB governs and monitors, as opposed to other offseason leagues (such as the Puerto Rican Winter League) located outside of the contiguous United States.

Player eligibility has changed over time; as of 2008, each MLB organization could only provide one player below the Double-A level, and before 2019 there were service-time limits for any players on the 40-man roster of an MLB team, but as of 2021 all players within an MLB organization are eligible. Free agents are not eligible. The seven players each MLB organization provides consist of four pitchers and three position players. Positional needs for each AFL team (e.g. catchers) are coordinated between player development directors of the affiliated MLB organizations via a "position draft". An MLB organization can assign more than three position players; such players serve as a taxi squad for the AFL team and are limited to playing two games each week.

Play generally begins after the conclusion of the World Series and runs until mid-November, although play continued into early December for the first five seasons that the league operated. Each team plays approximately 30 games; schedule length has varied somewhat during the league's history. Following the end of the league's regular season, the two division winners meet in a championship game.

Players wear uniforms of their respective MLB parent club. The league had its own team-specific uniforms before 1998. The manager, pitching coach, and hitting coach of each AFL team are provided by MLB organizations on a rotating basis.

Each team plays home games at its own ballpark, each of which currently has a seating capacity in excess of 10,000 spectators. For the 2019 season, only four venues were used due to ballpark renovation work.

The league has organized an annual all-star game since 2006. Initially known as the "Rising Stars Showcase", it has been branded as the "Fall Stars Game" since at least 2013. Players for the game are selected by league staff, scouting and farm directors, and MLB.com writers.

History
The league's inaugural season was 1992, during which each team played a 54-game schedule that ended in early December. The divisions and teams that season were:
 Northern division: Grand Canyon Rafters, Scottsdale Scorpions, Sun Cities Solar Sox
 Southern division: Chandler Diamondbacks, Phoenix Saguaros, Tucson Javelinas

The league's first game was played on October 6, 1992, with the Grand Canyon Rafters defeating the Scottsdale Scorpions, 6–4.

Before the 1994 season, the Javelinas relocated from Tucson to Peoria, to limit travel distances to the Phoenix metropolitan area. All teams been located in greater Phoenix since then.

Since 1995, when the Diamondbacks became the Desert Dogs, no team has changed its nickname. However, each team has changed its location at least once during its history. The most recent change was by the Desert Dogs, who moved from Phoenix to Glendale in 2013.

For the 1998 season, organizers rostered players onto each Arizona Fall League team from a single division in MLB:

 American League East – Grand Canyon Rafters
 American League Central – Phoenix Desert Dogs
 American League West – Peoria Javelinas

 National League East – Sun Cities Solar Sox
 National League Central – Maryvale Saguaros
 National League West – Scottsdale Scorpions

In 2007, the United States national baseball team and China national baseball team played several games against AFL teams; both teams were later competitors in baseball at the 2008 Summer Olympics. In 2019, the Mesa Solar Sox participated in the Vamos a Tucson Mexican Baseball Fiesta in early October, facing teams of the Mexican Pacific League.

In 2019, the league adopted a new logo. In 2020, the season was cancelled due to the COVID-19 pandemic.

A number of future MLB All-Stars have had stints in the Arizona Fall League; over 300, per the league's website. These include David Wright (2003), Dustin Pedroia (2004), Andre Ethier (2005), Bryce Harper (2010–2011), Nolan Arenado (2011), Mike Trout (2011), Mookie Betts (2013), Aaron Judge (2014), Gleyber Torres (2016), and Ronald Acuña Jr. (2017). In 1994, Michael Jordan played for Scottsdale during his time away from the NBA. Similarly, former NFL quarterback Tim Tebow played for Scottsdale in 2016 during his foray into professional baseball.

Current teams
Each stadium hosts one or two of its MLB affiliates, denoted in bold, during spring training. Each listed city is in Arizona.

Results by season
Results for each team since the league's inaugural 1992 season are listed below. Teams are listed by their nicknames only, independent of location, as various team locations have changed over time. Tie games are not listed, as they are excluded from winning percentage calculations, which determine division standings. The best winning percentage for a season was by the Saguaros who went 26–10 (.722) in 2011, while the worst was by the Saguaros in 2002 with a record of 11–32 (.256).

Through 1997, teams were organized into Northern and Southern divisions. For the 1998 season, American and National divisions were designated. From 1999 to 2021, the divisions were named East and West, except for four seasons (2003–2005 and 2008) when American and National naming was again used.

As of the 2022 season, divisions have been eliminated. The top three teams in the final regular season standings qualify for the postseason. The second- and third-place teams meet in a play-in semi-final game, with the winner facing the first-place team in the championship game.

Division winners appear in bold type from 1992 to 2021; beginning with 2022, the top three teams that qualify for the postseason appear in bold type. Tie-breaking procedures (such as between the Saguaros and Javelinas in 2021 for the West division title) are unclear.

Championship history 
From 1992 to 2021, the first-place teams from both divisions met for the league championship. Originally a best-of-three series, it was played as a single game from 2001 to 2021.

As of the 2022 season, divisions have been eliminated. The top three teams in the final regular season standings qualify for the postseason. The second- and third-place teams meet in a play-in semi-final game, with the winner facing the first-place team in the championship game.

The Peoria Javelinas have won the most championships, seven. The most consecutive championships is five, accomplished by the Phoenix Desert Dogs during 2004–2008. No championship game was held in 2020, as the season was canceled due to the COVID-19 pandemic.

Appearances by team

Notes:
 In the Seasons column, bold type indicates a championship
 Each current team has appeared under at least one former name:
 Glendale Desert Dogs made eight appearances as the Phoenix Desert Dogs and one as the Mesa Desert Dogs
 Mesa Solar Sox made three appearances as the Sun Cities Solar Sox
 Peoria Javelinas made one appearance as the Tucson Javelinas
 Salt River Rafters made five appearances as the Grand Canyon Rafters and one each as the Tempe Rafters and Surprise Rafters
 Scottsdale Scorpions made one appearance as the Surprise Scorpions
 Surprise Saguaros made three appearances as the Mesa Saguaros and one each as the Phoenix Saguaros and Maryvale Saguaros

Awards

Most Valuable Player award

First presented in 2002 and named for Joe Black of the Brooklyn Dodgers, the award honors the 1952 National League Rookie of the Year.

Source:

Stenson Award

The Dernell Stenson Sportsmanship Award was created in 2004, in memory of Dernell Stenson, an outfielder for the Scottsdale Scorpions (Cincinnati Reds), who was killed in a carjacking on November 5, 2003. The award is voted on by the managers and coaches of the six Arizona Fall League teams.

Performance-based awards
In 2021, the league added several awards: pitcher, hitter, reliever, breakout player, and defensive player of the year. Winners are listed in the below table with their position and major-league organization.

Hall of Fame

The Arizona Fall League Hall of Fame was created in 2001. The AFL has had over 1,200 former players reach Major League Baseball. Additionally, 18 former AFL managers or players have gone on to manage a major league club after managing in the league. To be considered by the selection committee, a player must be recognized at the major league level as a Rookie of the Year, a Most Valuable Player, an All-Star, or a Gold Glove or Silver Slugger Award winner. Through 2019, there were 46 inductees to the hall.

All-star game results 
Through the 2021 edition, East and West have each won 7 of their 14 contests. The 2008 edition was staged as National vs. American, with the National team prevailing. No game was held in 2020, as the season was canceled due to the COVID-19 pandemic. Only one game, the 2007 edition, has gone into extra innings.

See also
 Arizona Fall League rosters

Notes

References

External links

 
Baseball leagues in Arizona
Sports in Maricopa County, Arizona
Minor baseball leagues in the United States
1992 establishments in Arizona
Sports leagues established in 1992
Professional sports leagues in the United States